Cazalis is the name of the following communes in France:

 Cazalis, Gironde, in the Gironde department
 Cazalis, Landes, in the Landes department

People 

 Henri Cazalis